The  is the Confucian coming of age ceremony. Both of these ceremonies are key Confucian rites, and are part of the "four rites", along with marriage, mourning rites, and sacrificial rituals.

The  and the  ceremony can be performed by people of any social class; however, rich people were more likely to hold the ceremony than poor people. Since 2010, large  ceremonies have taken place each year at Wenmiao, in Taiyuan, Shanxi.

History 
The  and the  ceremony appeared in China in ancient times, prior to the Qin era. Some philosophical texts dating from the Zhou dynasty and Warring States period provide some evidence for the  ceremony, for example in the Analects of Confucius and by texts written by Mencius. The  ceremony can also be found in the Han Shu.

Ceremony 
The  is also known as the "capping" ceremony. The character  is sometimes translated as crown or cap. As a coming of age ceremony, the  ceremony marks the passage of man from childhood to adulthood. It is only after the  ceremony that a man is considered an adult and can be given adult responsibilities and rights; for example, a man could become the heir of his family, get married, inherit a business, and participate in other aspects of society.

Age 
The  ceremony typically occurs when a man reaches 20 years old.

Location and organization of ceremony 
The ceremony takes place in the young man's ancestral temple on a carefully chosen date, which was considered auspicious, and it was organized by a respectable senior relative of the young man.  It could also be done by the eastern stairs (which was the entrance typically used by the master of the house) if the boy was a son by the proper wife, to symbolize that he was in the succession line.

On the day of the ceremony, many guests were invited, including the parents of the young man, the master of the ceremony, and an assistant.

Procedures of  ceremony 
The procedures of ceremony occur through the following steps:

 Before the ceremony, the boy takes a bath; his hair is done and he then waits in a room.
At the beginning of the ceremony, the father of the boy gives a brief speech.
The boy comes out from the room and meets with the guests.
The father of the boy would hand him a cup, in the guest's place, without receiving one in return.
The senior relative, or the master of the ceremony, washes his hands.
 The senior relative places three caps on head of the young man, as follows:
After that he comes out and returns to the ceremony master.
The ceremony master then gives him another cap; the boy goes back to the room and comes back wearing a dark coloured clothing which is worn by adult men to match the cap.
The young man gives a salute to all the guests and officially becomes a "man". 
 The young man would obtain a courtesy name.

Derivatives and influences

Korea 
Following the Confucian tradition, Korean also performed the "capping" ceremony, known as Gwallye as a symbol of coming-of-age for men. On the day of the coming-of-age ceremony, Korean men would have their hair put up in a top knot and cover it with a hat (e.g. a gat) and were official given responsibilities as an adult men.

Related content 

 Ji Li (ceremony) – equivalent ceremony for women
 
 Hanfu

See also 
Genpuku, the Japanese coming-of-age ceremony
Cug Huê Hng, the Teochew coming-of-age ceremony

References 

Chinese culture
Rites of passage
East Asian traditions
Confucian rites